Charmkhowran-e Sofla (also Romanized as Charmkhowrān-e Soflá; also known as Charmkhowrān-e Pā'īn and Charmkhvār-e Pā'īn) is a village in Abbas-e Gharbi Rural District, Tekmeh Dash District, Bostanabad County, East Azerbaijan Province, Iran. At the 2006 census, its population was 416, in 99 families.

References 

Populated places in Bostanabad County